Daniel P. Sheehan (born April 9, 1945) is a constitutional and public interest lawyer, public speaker, political activist and educator.

Biography

Daniel P. Sheehan (born April 9, 1945) is a constitutional and public interest lawyer, political activist, public speaker, and educator. He is a graduate of Harvard Law School, Harvard College, and Harvard Divinity School.

Over the course of his career, Daniel Sheehan has participated in numerous legal cases of public interest, including cases related to the Pentagon Papers, the Attica Prison riot, the Wounded Knee Occupation, the death of Karen Silkwood, the Greensboro massacre, The Three Mile Island accident, the American Sanctuary Movement, and the La Penca bombing. Sheehan has also represented controversial groups such as the Black Panther Party of Boston and the Church of Scientology. Sheehan has worked with attorneys of note such as F. Lee Bailey, Gerry Spence, and William Kunstler. He served as an attorney for regional and national offices of the American Civil Liberties Union. Sheehan and his wife, activist Sara Nelson, established the Christic Institute (1980-1992) and reconstituted the Romero Institute (formerly the Oscar Romero Foundation), two inter-faith non-profit law and public policy centers.

From an early age Sheehan has believed in the existence of extraterrestrial civilizations. He has lectured widely about UFOs/alien visitation, conducted a study of UFOs for the Congressional Research Service, defended an academic whose research on UFO had been criticized by colleagues, participated in Disclosure Project events, discussed the topic several times on the Coast to Coast AM radio program, and established an institute intended to foster a new theological worldview necessary for a “post-contact reality.”

Sheehan and the Christic Institute achieved their greatest public prominence in 1986 when Sheehan used the federal RICO (Racketeer Influenced and Corrupt Organizations) Act to sue 30 individuals on behalf of Tony Avirgan, an American journalist injured in a 1984 bombing intended to kill Contra military leader Eden Pastora in La Penca, Nicaragua. Sheehan alleged that the bombing was the work of an anti-communist, self-enriching “Secret Team” within the US government which had been responsible for money laundering, political assassinations, illegal arms transfers, and drug-running across the globe since the 1970s. Some of the individuals identified in Sheehan’s complaint were figures in the Iran-Contra affair, which was coming to light at the time. Sheehan’s publicity and fundraising efforts for the case and subsequent appeals included an appearance on C-SPAN, two books based on the suit, a graphic novel by Alan Moore, Bill Sienkiewicz and Paul Mavrides, and benefit concerts featuring Bobcat Goldthwaite, Michelle Shocked, Jackson Browne, Graham Nash, David Crosby, Bonnie Raitt, Kris Kristofferson and Bruce Springsteen. Sheehan, Christic and its lawsuit were praised by Congressman Don Edwards, Reverend Jesse Jackson, Coretta Scott King, Daniel Ellsberg and other liberal Americans. In 1988 Judge James L. King of the United States District Court for the Southern District of Florida granted summary judgment in favor of the defendants, claiming the suit was based on “unsubstantiated rumor and speculation from unidentified sources with no first-hand knowledge.” Two subsequent appeals were denied. The Christic Institute sold its assets to pay more than $1 million in attorney’s fees and court costs ordered by the court, lost its charitable status, and was dissolved. Sheehan and Nelson subsequently moved from Washington DC to California.

After the dismissal Avirgan criticized Sheehan for including “numerous undocumented allegations” in the suit and for inflating the case from beyond the issue of the bombing to an indictment of a “broad, 30-year conspiracy.” Chip Berlet of Political Research Associates criticized Sheehan and Christic for incorporating right-wing conspiracy theories into their case. Berlet grouped Sheehan with the researchers John Judge, Mark Lane, Dave Emory, Barbara Honneger, and Mae Brussell who have “created a progressive constituency that confuses demagoguery with leadership, and undocumented conspiracism with serious research.”. Nelson, however, complained that the “hard left” had unfairly criticized Christic for its use of military men as witnesses in its case. Decades later, the La Penca bomber was identified by Avirgan, Avirgan's wife and journalism partner Martha Honey, and others as an Argentinian “double agent” who was working for an official of Nicaragua’s Sandinista government. Honey complained that, “…we had wasted millions of dollars and a decade with Sheehan.”

Subsequent Sheehan activities include: lecture series on American history and contemporary politics at several California universities (1994-2019); another unsuccessful lawsuit which claimed a purported murder was related to secret government activities (the Col. Joseph Sabow Case); participation in legal cases related to the Dakota Access Pipeline protests; legal representation of a UAP (Unidentified Aerial Phenomenon) “whistleblower” who claims to have been defamed by the Defense Department, and advocacy for California “clean car” legislation. Sheehan is currently Chief Counsel of the Romero Institute, where his focus is the Lakota People's Law Project and the Let’s Green CA! initiative. He currently lives in Santa Cruz, California.

Works

Books
 People's Advocate: The Life and Legal History of America's Most Fearless Public Interest Lawyer. Berkeley, Calif.: Counterpoint (2013). .

Book contributions
 Introduction to Shadowplay: The Secret Team, by Alan Moore and Bill Sienkiewicz. Based on the lawsuit filed by the Christic Institute. Forestville, Calif.: Eclipse Books (1989).
 Published in Brought to Light: Thirty Years of Drug Smuggling, Arms Deals, and Covert Action, a double-feature graphic novel edited by Joyce Brabner. The second story is Flashpoint: The La Penca Bombing, documented by Martha Honey and Tony Avirgan and adapted by Joyce Brabner and Tom Yeates, with an introduction by Jonathan V. Marshall.

Transcripts
 Assault on Nicaragua: The Untold Story of the "Secret War"—Speeches by Daniel Sheehan and Daniel Ortega. San Francisco: Walnut Pub. Co. (1987). . Edited with introduction by Rod Holt.
 "The Secret Team Behind the Iran-Contra Scandal." Piedmont, California (September 4, 1987). Remarks at a casual after-dinner gathering of friends and supporters of the Christic Institute. Sheehan spoke earlier that day at a gathering of leaders of organized labor in San Francisco. pp. 16-54.
 "A Discussion with Daniel Sheehan and Sarah Nelson." Los Angeles, California (February 1, 1987). pp. 55-78.

Audio recordings
 Contragate: The Secret Team, with the Christic Institute. Santa Barbara, Calif.: Other Americas Radio (1987). .

References

External links
 
 Curriculum vitae
  Lakota People's Law Project
 Daniel Sheehan at Spartacus Educational

Date of birth missing (living people)
Living people
American educators
American lawyers
Harvard Divinity School alumni
Harvard Law School alumni
Harvard College alumni
American conspiracy theorists
1945 births